Sheila Nduhukire (born 23 April 1990) is Ugandan journalist, news editor and senior anchor with NBS Television and a fellow of 2017 International Women's Media Foundation (IWMF) Great Lakes Reporting Initiative cohort.

Sheila is a former senior News anchor with NTV Uganda. Her investigative reporting is specialized in current political affairs, dysfunctions of the economy, and social matters.

Early life and education 
Sheila is a second born of seven in Kazo, Kiruhura District, She went to Uganda Martyr's SS Namugongo for Uganda Certificate of Education (UCE) for lower secondary education, after she joined Bweranyangi Girls SS for her advanced secondary level known as Uganda Advanced Certification of Education (UACE) and later she enrolled at Mbarara University of Science and Technology (MUST) for a Bachelor of Business Administration, where she was elected as the student's Guild president.

Journalism career 
After finishing her studies from MUST, she worked as reporter for Red Pepper, a local tabloid newspaper and later received an internship placement at the Ugandan Parliament while working as a freelance journalist with Daily Monitor, which helped her gain skills that got her an entry to NTV Uganda that she later left for NBS Television.

References 

People from Rukungiri District
Ugandan journalists
Ugandan women journalists
Ugandan television journalists
Ugandan women television journalists
Living people
1990 births
Mbarara University of Science and Technology